The Panjdeh Incident (known in Russian historiography as the Battle of Kushka) was an armed engagement between the Emirate of Afghanistan and the Russian Empire in 1885 that led to a diplomatic crisis between the British Empire and the Russian Empire regarding the Russian expansion south-eastwards towards the Emirate of Afghanistan and the British Raj (India). After nearly completing the Russian conquest of Central Asia (Russian Turkestan), the Russians captured an Afghan border fort, threatening British interests in the area. Seeing this as a threat to India, Britain prepared for war but both sides backed down and the matter was settled diplomatically. The incident halted further Russian expansion in Asia, except for the Pamir Mountains, and resulted in the definition of the north-western border of Afghanistan.

Background
After the Battle of Geok Tepe in January 1881 and the annexation of Merv in March 1884, Russia held most of what is now Turkmenistan. To the south of Merv, towards Herat in Afghanistan, the border was not clearly defined. The British were concerned because the Merv–Herat–Kandahar–Quetta line was a natural invasion route to India. The Russians had commenced construction of the Trans-Caspian Railway which would allow them to bring men and supplies to Merv and beyond.

Most of Turkmenistan is desert but irrigation supports a fairly dense population on the north slope of the Kopet Dag (Geok Tepe and Ashgabat). East of this are the oases of Tejend and Merv, one of the great cities of central Asia. Tejend was much smaller and to the south of Tejend and Merv is a grassy region sometimes called Badghis which is bounded by the Hari-Rud river on the west and the Murghab River to the east. The Hari-Rud flows north along the modern Iranian border, enters Turkmenistan and spreads out forming the Tejend oasis before drying up in the desert. The Murghab flows north through what is now Afghanistan and Turkmenistan, reaches Yoloten and spreads out, forming the Merv oasis. Where the Murghab crosses the current border, the irrigated area of Panjdeh (Five Villages) existed. South of Badghis is the important Afghan city and border fort of Herat.

This border had never been properly defined.

Build-up
In 1882, Britain and Russia began discussions about the Afghan boundary. In the summer of 1884, they agreed to form an Afghan Boundary Commission, the commissioners including Russian General Zelenoi and British General Sir Peter Lumsden. They were to meet at Serakhs in October but both were delayed. The Russians tried to push the border as far to the south as possible before it became fixed. General Komarov, governor of the Transcaspian Oblast, went south to Serakhs and expelled a Persian garrison on the east side of the Hari-Rud. On the east side, the Sarik Turkomans of Yoloten submitted to the Russians in May 1884 but their kinsmen at Panjdeh refused, saying that they were subjects of the Amir of Kabul.

The Afghans sent troops to Bala Murghab and in June began building a fort at the north end of Panjdeh at the mouth of the Kushk River, which they called Ak-Tepe (White Hill; probably the old fort visible from space at ). The Russians thought that the Afghans had done this with British connivance but the Afghans and the British claimed that the people of Panjdeh had always paid tribute to the Afghans or whoever controlled Herat. The Russians claimed that Panjdeh had never been garrisoned and that its people were part of a tribe that had submitted to Russia.

On 8 November, Lumsden arrived at Serakhs with 250 Sepoys and 200 Bengal Lancers, having crossed little-known country in Baluchistan. Komarov avoided meeting him, claiming he was "occupied with other affairs." In mid-November, Komarov made a move up the Murghab toward Panjdeh and more Afghan troops were shifted up to counter this. The Russians built an advanced post at Sanduk Kuchan (Sandykgachy?) on the Murghab. Alikhanov went to parley with the Ak Tepe commander but was driven away with threats.

Russian attack
For a few months there was a lull. Lumsden advised the Afghans to withdraw further south. On 25 March, Komarov arrived at Kazyl Tepe with 1,500 men. Two days later, they advanced, apparently trying to provoke the Afghans into firing first. Captain Charles Yate was the most senior British officer present, with only two other Europeans, and they futilely attempted to defuse the situation by talking to the Russian officers.

On 30 March 1885, the Russians captured Ak Tepe with a reported loss of 900 Afghans and 11 Russians. The news reached England on 7 April and preparations for war began. On 27 April, William Gladstone asked the Commons for a credit of £11 million (£4.5 million for Sudan and the rest for Russia). Alexander III of Russia suggested arbitration and negotiations which the British accepted. The crisis was partly averted by the initiative of Abdur Rahman Khan, the Amir of Afghanistan, who was then at Rawalpindi engaged in talks with the British. Having no desire to see two foreign armies fighting in his country, when told of Panjdeh, he pretended to regard it as a mere border skirmish.

In mid-summer, Lord Salisbury replaced Gladstone, which may have made British threats more credible. By 10 September, it was roughly agreed that Russia would keep Panjdeh, give up Zulfikar, and that the border would be approximately where it is now. The border commissioners started at Zulfikar on 10 November, reached the Murghab by Christmas, and went into winter quarters. In 1886, the line was run from the Murghab to the Oxus. Some minor problems had to be resolved by diplomats and the final protocol was signed on 22 July 1887. Persia somehow retained the Atak country north-west of Serakhs into which Russian patrols had penetrated.

Aftermath
The absence of British aid to Afghanistan was seen as a violation of the Treaty of Gandamak. This led the Amir to believe that he could not rely on the British in the face of Russian aggression. Tensions between Russia and Britain eased when the Russian foreign minister Nikolay Girs and the ambassador to London Baron de Staal set up an agreement in 1887 that established a buffer zone in Central Asia. Russian diplomacy thereby won grudging British acceptance of its expansionism.

In 1890, Russia founded Kushka (Serhetabat) at the south end of the new territory and, in 1901, connected Kushka by rail to Merv. Kushka remained the southernmost settlement in the Russian Empire and later the Soviet Union. The 1921, Afghan-Soviet Treaty of Friendship was the first international agreement made by the Soviet Union. Although "the Soviets agreed to return to Afghanistan, subject to plebiscites, territories in the Panjdeh area ceded under duress by Afghanistan to Russia or Bukhara in the nineteenth century," this was not done.

References
 
  (stops at November 1884)
 Salisbury, Robert (2020). William Simpson and the Crisis in Central Asia, 1884-5.

Notes

External links
 

1885 in Asia
1885 in Afghanistan
Afghanistan–Russia relations
Military history of Afghanistan
Battles involving Russia
Conflicts in 1885
History of Turkmenistan
Russia–United Kingdom relations
Great Game
Central Asia in the Russian Empire